James Clinton (1733–1812) was an American Revolutionary War officer.

James Clinton may also refer to:
 James Clinton (soldier) (1667–1718), Irish soldier and politician
 James G. Clinton (1804–1849), American lawyer and politician
 James Vivian Clinton, Nigerian journalist
 James Clinton (sternwheeler), a steamboat on the upper Willamette River
 Jim Clinton (1850–1921), outfielder in Major League Baseball

Clinton, James